Sampang may refer to:

 Sampang (town)
 Sampang Regency
 Sampang language